The Roman Catholic Diocese of Villa María is a Catholic diocese located in the city of Villa María in the Ecclesiastical province of Córdoba in Argentina.

History
On 11 February 1957, Pope Pius XII established the Diocese of Villa María from the Archdiocese of Córdoba.

Bishops

Ordinaries
Alberto Deane C.P. (1957–1977) 
Cándido Genaro Rubiolo (1977–1979), appointed Archbishop of Mendoza
Alfredo Guillermo Disandro (1980–1998) 
Roberto Rodríguez (1998–2006), appointed Bishop of La Rioja
José Ángel Rovai (2006–2013) 
Samuel Jofré Giraudo (2013– )

Other priest of this diocese who became bishop
Damián Santiago Bitar, appointed Auxiliary Bishop of San Justo in 2008

References

Roman Catholic dioceses in Argentina
Roman Catholic Ecclesiastical Province of Córdoba
Christian organizations established in 1957
Roman Catholic dioceses and prelatures established in the 20th century